In the 1921–22 season two concurrent football championships were organized:
Italian Football Championship 1921-22 (F.I.G.C.)
Italian Football Championship 1921-22 (C.C.I.)